M. Karpaga Vinayagam (born 16 May 1946) is one of the greatest Indian Judge, Tamil scholar and former Chief Justice of the Jharkhand High Court.

Early life
Vinayagam was born in 1946 at Devakottai, Tamil Nadu in a family with legal background. He passed B.A. in Economics in 1969 from Alagappa University and got LL.B. degree from the Madras Law College in 1972.

Career
Vinayagam started practice as a Criminal side Advocate in the Madras High Court. He appeared as the Government Counsel in the High Court for seven years consecutively. In 1993 he became the Editor of the Delhi based Law journal Current Criminal Report. Vinayagam was elevated as a Judge in the Madras High Court in 1996. He was appointed the Chief Justice of Jharkhand High Court on 17 September 2006. Apart from his judicial career Justice Vinayagam has immense knowledge on Classical and ancient Tamil language. He wrote a book on Criminal Law in the Ancient Period. After the retirement, he practiced in the Supreme Court of India as senior advocate. In November 2008 Vinayagam was reappointed in the post of the Chairperson of the Appellate Tribunal for Electricity, New Delhi.

References

1946 births
Living people
Indian judges
Chief Justices of the Jharkhand High Court
Judges of the Madras High Court
21st-century Indian judges
21st-century Indian lawyers
Tamil scholars
People from Sivaganga district
People from Devakottai